Danny Morrison is Professor of Practice in the Department of Sport and Entertainment at the University of South Carolina, United States. Prior to joining the faculty, he was the president of the Carolina Panthers and worked extensively in college sports administration.

Morrison was the athletic director at Wofford College from 1985 to 1997 and a senior vice president until 2001. As a student he played basketball for the Terriers. It was during his time as athletic director that the Panthers began holding training camp there. He was inducted into the Wofford College Athletic Hall of Fame in 2002. He served as commissioner of the Southern Conference from 2001 to 2005. From 2005 until September 2009, he was the athletic director of Texas Christian University.

He was named president of the Panthers in September 2008, replacing Mark Richardson, son of owner, Jerry Richardson.

In the 2015 season, Morrison's Panthers reached Super Bowl 50 on February 7, 2016. The Panthers fell to the Denver Broncos by a score of 24–10.

Morrison resigned from his position on February 9, 2017, stating "there are other endeavors, particularly on the college level, that interest me as a final chapter in my career."

On January 29, 2019 Morrison was named Executive Director of the Charlotte Sports Foundation effective May 1, 2019. CSF owns and operates the season-opening Belk College Kickoff and postseason Belk Bowl, in addition to serving as
the local organizing committee for the Dr Pepper ACC Football Championship in Charlotte.

Personal life
He is a native of Burlington, North Carolina. He has degrees from Wofford (B.A. Mathematics, summa cum laude, Phi Beta Kappa), North Carolina (Master of Education), and University of South Carolina (Ph.D Educational Leadership).

References

Year of birth missing (living people)
Living people
Carolina Panthers executives
National Football League team presidents
Southern Conference commissioners
TCU Horned Frogs athletic directors
Wofford Terriers men's basketball players
Wofford Terriers athletic directors
University of North Carolina at Chapel Hill alumni
University of South Carolina alumni
People from Burlington, North Carolina